Beyond the Brightness is the second full-length recording by Swedish band The Grand Opening. Originally released on Hamburg label Tapete Records.

Track listing
"Anxious Looks"
"Secrets Revealed"
"On the Losing End"
"Lonely Hearts Night Out"
"Beyond the Brightness"
"Dark Dark Dawn"
"Chainbreak"
"Convenient Situations"
"Trapdoor"

Personnel
John Roger Olsson: vocals, guitar, drums, bass, vibraphone, Fender Rhodes
Jens Pettersson: drums, backing vocals

References

2008 albums
The Grand Opening albums
Tapete Records albums